NSS-8 was a Dutch telecommunications satellite that was destroyed during launch. It was a Boeing 702 spacecraft with 56 C-band and 36 Ku-band transponders, and it was part of the SES NEW SKIES.

The satellite, which was insured, was destroyed when the rocket that was launching it exploded. The rocket was a Zenit 3SL being launched by Sea Launch from its Ocean Odyssey launch pad. The launch attempt occurred at 23:22 GMT on 30 January 2007. "There was an explosion as we were lifting off," said Paula Korn, a spokeswoman for Sea Launch.

NSS-8 was designed to support a wide range of functions, including broadcast applications, government and military operations, corporate communications and Broadband Internet services. When placed in its final orbital position (57° E), the satellite would have provided coverage to two-thirds of the planet, serving countries in Europe, Africa, the Middle East, the Indian subcontinent and Asia.

See also

Sea Launch
Intelsat 27
2007 in spaceflight

References

External links
 Launch video

Satellites using the BSS-702 bus
Communications satellites
Satellite launch failures
Spacecraft launched in 2007
Spacecraft launched by Zenit and Energia rockets
SES satellites